Count the Hours! is a 1953 crime film noir directed by Don Siegel, featuring Macdonald Carey, Teresa Wright, John Craven, and Jack Elam.

Plot
The bodies of farmer Fred Morgan and his housekeeper are found. Suspicion falls on hired hand George Braden, who owns a handgun that his pregnant wife Ellen disposes of in a panic.

Braden confesses under the interrogation of district attorney Jim Gillespie, possibly to spare his wife any more grief. Doug Madison is assigned the case in court, but doesn't believe in Braden's innocence until he sees Ellen diving into the lake, attempting to retrieve the gun.

Madison's fiancée doesn't want him defending an unpopular client because it could harm his political future. A diver hired by Madison makes a play for Ellen, and when he is fired, he suggests Madison is romantically involved with Ellen.

After a conviction and death sentence for Braden, it comes to Madison's attention that an ex-con named Max Verne had worked for the dead man and made threats after being dismissed. Madison ends up in a race against time to prove Braden's innocence before he is executed.

Cast
 Macdonald Carey as Doug Madison
 Teresa Wright as Ellen Braden
 John Craven as George Braden
 Jack Elam as Max Verne
 Edgar Barrier as D.A. Jim Gillespie
 Dolores Moran as Paula Mitchener
 Adele Mara as Gracie Sager, Max Verne's Girlfriend
 Ralph Sanford as Alvin Taylor
 Dolores Fuller as Reporter (uncredited)

See also
List of films featuring home invasions

References

External links
 
 
 

1953 films
1953 crime drama films
American crime drama films
American black-and-white films
Films about miscarriage of justice
American courtroom films
Film noir
Films directed by Don Siegel
RKO Pictures films
1950s English-language films
1950s American films